Thomas Vaubourzeix (born 16 June 1989) is a French racing cyclist, who currently rides for UCI Continental team . He rode in the men's team time trial at the 2015 UCI Road World Championships.

Major results

2010
 1st Stage 1 Kreiz Breizh Elites
2011
 7th Duo Normand (with Julien Antomarchi)
2012
 1st  Mountains classification Tour Méditerranéen
 1st Stage 3 Tour de Bretagne
 6th Overall Tour of Taihu Lake
2013
 2nd Paris–Troyes
2014
 1st  Mountains classification Boucles de la Mayenne
 2nd Overall Tour of Qinghai Lake
1st Stage 5
2015
 1st  Sprints classification Boucles de la Mayenne
 3rd Grand Prix Criquielion
 6th Flèche Ardennaise
 8th Overall Tour of Qinghai Lake
2016
 Challenge du Prince
1st Trophée Princier
2nd Trophée de la Maison Royale
 3rd Overall Tour de Tunisie
1st Stage 3
 4th Overall Grand Prix Cycliste de Saguenay
2017
 1st Trophée Princier, Challenge du Prince
 Les Challenges de la Marche Verte
4th GP Al Massira
6th GP Sakia El Hamra
9th GP Oued Eddahab

References

External links

1989 births
Living people
French male cyclists
Sportspeople from Var (department)
Cyclists from Provence-Alpes-Côte d'Azur